Banyan is considered holy in several religious traditions of India. The Ficus benghalensis is the National tree of India, and also the state tree of Madhya Pradesh.

The following is a list of notable Banyan trees in India. Trees listed here are regarded as important or specific by its historical, national, locational, natural or mythological context. Banyan trees left in India. The list includes actual Banyan trees located throughout the India.

 Thimmamma Marrimanu,  the tree is situated about 35 km from Kadri Lakshmi Narasimha temple in Anantapur district, Andhra Pradesh. Its branches spread over 4 acres, with a canopy of 19,107 square metres and it was recorded as the largest tree specimen in the world in the Guinness Book of World Records in 1989.
 Kabirvad, Gujarat is one of the biggest banyan tree in India. Currently the area of its canopy is 17,520 m2 (4.33 acres) with a perimeter of 641 m (2,103 ft). Named after saint Kabir, it is one of the most famous destination for tourists in Gujarat near Bharuch city.
 The Great Banyan in the botanical garden near Kolkata, a clonal colony of Indian Banyan with a crown circumference of over 330 meter.  The area occupied by the tree is about 18,918 square metres (about 1.89 hectares or 4.67 acres). The present crown of the tree has a circumference of 486 m. and the highest branch rises to 24.5 m; it has at present 3772 aerial roots reaching down to the ground as a prop root. Its height is almost equivalent to the Gateway of India.
Pillalamarri,  800-year-old banyan tree located in Mahabubnagar, Telangana, India. The tree is spread over an area of 4 acres, according to archeological survey of India it is the third largest in India.
 The 450-year-old giant Banyan tree at Adyar in Chennai, Tamil Nadu, India, in the grounds of the Theosophical Society headquarters under which people listened to discourses by intellectuals including J. Krishnamurti, Annie Besant and Maria Montessori.
 Dodda Alada Mara, the 400-year-old tree also called the Big Banyan Tree at Ramohalli, Bengaluru, Karnataka. It is 95 feet tall and spreads across an area of 3 acres. This tree is located 28 km from Bengaluru.
 Chosath Yogini temple: a 1000 year old Banyan tree, located in Maharajpur, Sagar, Madhya Pradesh (India), spread in 50000sq feet, the biggest banyan tree of central India
 A huge banyan tree spread across 2.5 acres of land inside the Pirbaba's Taroda sacred grove located in Amravati district, Maharashtra. The tree is considered sacred.
 Cholti Kheri sacred tree in Fatehgarh Sahib district of Punjab.
 Pemgiri, with 3.5 acres spread it is largest banyan tree of Maharashtra, 16 km west from Sangamner on Pune-Nasik Highway

See also 

 Sacred related 
 Sacred trees
 Bodhi Tree
 Sacred groves
 Sacred groves of India
 Tree worship
 Sacred mountains
 Sacred natural site
 Sacred rivers
 Sacred site
 General
 List of individual trees
 List of types of formally designated forests
 Superlative trees
 Tree hugger (disambiguation)
 World mountain

References

India
Trees of India
Banyan Trees Of India
Banyan trees